Heidelberg-Südstadt ("South Town") is a district of the city of Heidelberg in Baden-Württemberg, Germany. It is a relatively young district and was established after World War 2, by extending the Weststadt district to the south, and the Rohrbach district to the north. Today, it houses about 4,400 citizens (including about 600 people not registered as residentials of the suburb). Südstadt is the second-smallest district of Heidelberg by population, after Schlierbach.

Geography of Heidelberg